Health Education Research is a bimonthly peer-reviewed academic journal covering health education. It was established in 1986 and is published by Oxford University Press. It is associated with the International Union for Health Promotion and Education. The editor-in-chief is Michael Eriksen (Georgia State University). According to the Journal Citation Reports, the journal has a 2015 impact factor of 1.667.

References

External links

Oxford University Press academic journals
Publications established in 1986
Bimonthly journals
Health education journals
English-language journals